South Ossetian passports are issued to inhabitants of South Ossetia (a disputed territory in the South Caucasus) for the purpose of international travel and for the purpose of legal identification within South Ossetia. They were first issued on August 15, 2006. Since South Ossetia is only recognised by Russia, Venezuela, Nicaragua, Nauru, and Syria, many South Ossetians also have Russian passports, which are more practical for international travel.

See also 
 Visa requirements for South Ossetian citizens
 International recognition of Abkhazia and South Ossetia
 Foreign relations of South Ossetia
 List of citizenships refused entry to foreign states

References 

South Ossetia